Han Jae-rim (born July 14, 1975) is a South Korean film director. He directed Rules of Dating (2005), The Show Must Go On (2007), The Face Reader (2013), The King (2017), and Emergency Declaration (2021).

Career
Born in 1975, Han Jae-rim graduated from Seoul Institute of the Arts in 1998. He began his filmmaking career in 2003 as an assistant director and script editor for Min Byung-chun's Natural City.

Han was the runner-up for Best Screenplay at the Korean Film Council (KOFIC) Screenplay Contest in 2003 with To Do or Not to Do, which he had co-written with Go Yoon-hee. Retitled Rules of Dating, it became his directorial debut in 2005. Featuring sexually frank dialogue between teacher colleagues played by Park Hae-il and Kang Hye-jung, the film explored controversial gender politics, sexual harassment and moral relativism in a cynical and unsettling take on the romantic comedy. Rules of Dating drew critical praise and became a sleeper hit with 1.6 million admissions. Han won Best Screenplay at the Blue Dragon Film Awards, along with Best New Director at the Busan Film Critics Awards and the Grand Bell Awards.

Han, Kim Jee-woon and Yim Pil-sung then signed on to each shoot a short film for the omnibus Doomsday Book in 2006. Han's segment "The Christmas Gift" was supposed to have been a science-fiction musical retelling of O. Henry's The Gift of the Magi, but it was never shot after financing fell through. The film was later released in 2012, but without Han's involvement (Kim and Yim co-directed the third short with a completely new script).

In 2007, he wrote and directed his second film, The Show Must Go On. Starring Korea's top actor Song Kang-ho as a mid-level gangster dealing with family and work troubles, Han injected off-kilter comedy and pathos into the Korean film noir genre. The Show Must Go On won Best Film at the Blue Dragon Film Awards and the Korean Association of Film Critics Awards.

Han entered pre-production for his purported third film, Trace in 2009. Based on the webtoon of the same title, it follows a young man who wakes up from a coma with superpowers after an assault that took his father's life. But despite winning the Kodak Award (with a cash prize of ) at the Busan International Film Festival's Pusan Promotion Plan, Han was unable to secure financing for the  blockbuster, and the project was shelved.

Six years after his last completed film, Han returned to the big screen in 2013 with period drama The Face Reader. The film delved into the philosophical question whether character determines fate or vice versa, in a story about a Joseon fortuneteller skilled in physiognomy who becomes swept up in court intrigues and power struggles. Again starring Song Kang-ho as the titular character opposite Lee Jung-jae as the ambitious Grand Prince Suyang, The Face Reader scored 9.1 million admissions at the local box office, making it the 13th highest grossing Korean film of all time. It won six trophies at the 50th Grand Bell Awards, including Best Film and Best Director for Han.

Han also produced Roh Deok's films Very Ordinary Couple (2013) and Journalist (2015).

Filmography 
Natural City (2003) - assistant director, script editor 
Rules of Dating (2005) - director, script editor
The Show Must Go On (2007) - director, screenwriter
Very Ordinary Couple (2013) - producer
The Face Reader (2013) - director, script editor 
Journalist (2015) - producer
The King (2017) - director, screenwriter
Emergency Declaration (2021) - director, screenwriter

Awards 
2005 26th Blue Dragon Film Awards: Best Screenplay (Rules of Dating)
2005 6th Busan Film Critics Awards: Best New Director (Rules of Dating)
2006 43rd Grand Bell Awards: Best New Director (Rules of Dating)
2013 50th Grand Bell Awards: Best Director (The Face Reader)
2017 54th Grand Bell Awards: Best Screenplay (The King)

References

External links
 
 
 

1975 births
Living people
South Korean film directors
South Korean screenwriters
South Korean film producers
Seoul Institute of the Arts alumni
People from Jeju Province